Hertsmere is a local government district and borough in Hertfordshire, England.  Its council is based in Borehamwood.  Other settlements in the borough include Bushey, Elstree, Radlett and Potters Bar. The borough borders the three north London boroughs of Harrow, Barnet and Enfield, and is located mainly within the M25 Motorway.

History
The district was formed on 1 April 1974, under the Local Government Act 1972, by a merger of the former area of Bushey Urban District and Potters Bar Urban District with Elstree Rural District and part of Watford Rural District (the parish of Aldenham). The Potters Bar Urban District (which coincided with the parish of South Mimms) was historically part of Middlesex, but had been transferred to Hertfordshire on 1 April 1965 when Greater London was created and Middlesex County Council abolished.

The name "Hertsmere" was invented for the new district by combining the common abbreviation of "Hertfordshire" ("Herts") with "mere", an archaic word for boundary. The name is doubly appropriate as the district straddles the historic county boundary between Middlesex and Hertfordshire and forms the administrative boundary between Hertfordshire and Greater London. The name is reflected in the council's coat of arms, which shows a hart upon the battlements of a boundary wall.

The district was awarded borough status on 15 April 1977.

The borough was originally in the Metropolitan Police District, despite being outside the modern Greater London boundaries.  It was transferred to Hertfordshire Constabulary in 2000.

Attractions
Hertsmere is the location of Elstree Film and TV Studios, which produces such shows as Strictly Come Dancing, Who Wants To Be A Millionaire, Dancing on Ice, and is the location for the Big Brother house. The studios were bought by Hertsmere Borough Council in 1996 and are operated via Elstree Film Studios Ltd.

Hertsmere is also the location for BBC Elstree Centre, the site of EastEnders, Holby City, and formerly the home to Top of the Pops, before its move to BBC TV Centre.

The area was also home to other TV and film studios, including MGM, until this was demolished for residential development, and is now an area called Studio Way.

Demographics
In the 2011 census, Hertsmere polled as the second most Jewish local authority in the United Kingdom, with Jews composing of one in seven residents (the highest being the North London borough of Barnet).

Politics

The borough council currently consists of 39 elected councillors, with all councillors being up for election at the same time every four years. As of the 2019 election there are 29 Conservative, 7 Labour and 3 Liberal Democrat councillors.

Until 1983 the borough was included in the parliamentary constituency of Hertfordshire South. In 1983 the constituency was renamed Hertsmere.

Hertsmere had been represented in Parliament by Conservative, James Clappison since 1992. He succeeded Cecil Parkinson who had been Member of Parliament for the area since 1974. It is now represented by the Conservative, Oliver Dowden.

Composition

The first council was elected in 1973 as a shadow authority, and was under no overall control: the Conservative Party won 25 seats, Labour 17 and the Liberals 13.

In 1976 the Conservatives gained a majority on the council which they held until 1994. For the next two years the council was under no overall control. The Labour Party then controlled the council from 1996 to the 1999 election, when the Conservatives regained control, which they have held since that date.

Wards
Hertsmere consists of fifteen wards.  Wards electing two members are denoted with an obelisk (†).

Civic Awards
In 2003, the Borough Council started to present a small number of Civic Awards to people who live or work in Hertsmere 'in recognition of work undertaken for the benefit of residents of the Borough'.

Premises
The council inherited offices at Rudolph Road in Bushey, Darkes Lane in Potters Bar, and Shenley Road in Borehamwood from its predecessor authorities. A new building, called Hertsmere Civic Offices, was built in 19751976 on Elstree Way in Borehamwood to serve as the council's principal offices and meeting place.

Elstree Studios
In 1993, the council bought Elstree Studios in Borehamwood. They are now operated by Elstree Film Studios Limited, a council-controlled company.

Parishes
The borough contains five parishes:
Elstree and Borehamwood (Town)
Aldenham
Ridge
Shenley
 South Mimms

Four parishes have parish councils Ridge, which has fewer than 200 electors, is governed by a parish meeting following the dissolution of its parish council.

The areas of the former Bushey and Potters Bar urban districts are unparished.

References

External links
 Hertsmere Borough Council official website

 
Districts of Hertfordshire
Boroughs in England